Valerie Woodbridge is an Australian Paralympic athlete. At the 1984 New York/Stoke Mandeville Games, she won a gold medal in the Women's Long Jump A2 event, a silver medal in the Women's Discus A2 event, and a bronze medal in the Women's Shot Put A2 event.

References

Paralympic athletes of Australia
Athletes (track and field) at the 1984 Summer Paralympics
Medalists at the 1984 Summer Paralympics
Paralympic gold medalists for Australia
Paralympic silver medalists for Australia
Paralympic bronze medalists for Australia
Paralympic medalists in athletics (track and field)
Year of birth missing (living people)
Living people
Australian female long jumpers
Australian female discus throwers
Australian female shot putters
Long jumpers with limb difference
Discus throwers with limb difference
Shot putters with limb difference
Paralympic long jumpers
Paralympic discus throwers
Paralympic shot putters
20th-century Australian women